Edward William Brown (July 17, 1891 – September 10, 1956) was an American professional baseball outfielder. He played in Major League Baseball (MLB) for the New York Giants, Brooklyn Robins, and Boston Braves between 1920 and 1928. A .303 lifetime hitter, he led the National League with 201 hits in 1926. Brown's nickname was "Glass Arm Eddie".

In 790 games over 7 seasons, Brown compiled a .303 batting average (878-for-2902) with 341 runs, 170 doubles, 33 triples, 16 home runs, 407 RBIs, 127 base on balls, 109 strikeouts, .334 on-base percentage and .400 slugging percentage. Defensively, he recorded a .970 fielding percentage.

References

External links

1891 births
1956 deaths
Major League Baseball outfielders
Brooklyn Robins players
New York Giants (NL) players
Boston Braves players
Baseball players from Nebraska
People from Fillmore County, Nebraska
Superior Brickmakers players
Fairbury Shaners players
Mason City Claydiggers players
San Antonio Bronchos players
San Antonio Bears players
Indianapolis Indians players
Toledo Mud Hens players
Dallas Steers players
Fort Worth Panthers players
Houston Buffaloes players
Omaha Packers players
Fairbury Jeffs players
Syracuse Orangemen baseball players